Ewingville is a section of Ewing Township in Mercer County, New Jersey, United States originally settled as a village on Shabakunk Creek. Located at the intersection of Ewingville Road/Upper Ferry Road and Pennington Road, it is one of the oldest settlements in Ewing Township and dates back to the 18th century. The community was known as Cross Keys before adopting its current name in 1836, two years after the incorporation of Ewing Township in 1834.

References

Neighborhoods in Ewing Township, New Jersey
Unincorporated communities in Mercer County, New Jersey
Unincorporated communities in New Jersey